{{DISPLAYTITLE:C11H11Cl2N}}
The molecular formula C11H11Cl2N (molar mass: 228.118 g/mol, exact mass: 227.0269 u) may refer to:

 Amitifadine
 DOV-102,677
 DOV-216,303

Molecular formulas